Colette Brown is an English actress. In 1994, she was a presenter of the children's television series, Hangar 17.  Brown appeared in an episode of the ITV drama A Touch of Frost in 1996. Her other television credits include Casualty and Ultraviolet in 1998, as well as the BBC One daytime soap Doctors and the Doctor Who spinoff Torchwood. Brown was born in South London in 1969. She has a son and a daughter with actor Gary Love.

Colette played Samantha Kennedy in the BBC medical drama Holby City.

Played the role of Michelle Connor in The Bill (S15 E140)

References

External links
 

English television actresses
English soap opera actresses
1969 births
Living people